Vallbona de les Monges is a municipality in the comarca of the Urgell in Catalonia, Spain. It is located at the southern end of the comarca, north of the Serra del Tallat, Catalan Pre-Coastal Range, where many wind turbines have been installed.

The town has the most important convent in Catalonia, the Monastery of Santa Maria de Vallbona, belonging to the Order of Cistercians. The main income is derived from wine and olive oil production, as well as some cattle. There is a little tourism, but not enough to significantly lift the economy of the area.

Villages
Montblanquet, 6 
Rocallaura, 93 
Vallbona de les Monges, 157

Demography

See also
Monastery of Santa Maria de Vallbona
Tossal Gros de Vallbona

References

Mapa Topogràfic de Catalunya - Institut Cartogràfic de Catalunya

External links

 Pàgina web de l'Ajuntament
 Government data pages 
 The Hungarian Queen of the Vallbona Abbey 

Municipalities in Urgell
Populated places in Urgell